Salizzole is a comune (municipality) in the Province of Verona in the Italian region Veneto, located about  west of Venice and about  southeast of Verona. Economy includes production of rice and of artistic furniture.

Salizzole borders the following municipalities: Bovolone, Concamarise, Isola della Scala, Nogara, and Sanguinetto.

Main sights

Churches
Santa Maria Assunta (15th century)
S. Caterina di Alessandria (15th century) 
S.Martino (16th century)

Villas
Corte Busa (15th century)
Villa Sagramoso-Campostrini-Malafatti (16th century)
Villa Zanetti (16th century)
Villa Franceschini (16th century))
Villa Pullè (17th century)

Fortifications
Castle (12th century). It was the residence of the family of Cangrande della Scala's mother.

References

External links
 Official website

Cities and towns in Veneto
Castles in Italy